The Principles for the Protection of Persons with Mental Illness and the Improvement of Mental Health Care  (MI Principles) were adopted by the United Nations General Assembly in 1991. They provide agreed but non-legally-binding basic standards that mental health systems should meet and rights that people diagnosed with mental disorder should have. Although the document underwent extensive drafting for 20 years and remains the international human rights agreement most specifically concerned with mental health, it has been criticised for not offering stronger protections in some areas. It should now be read in the context of the United Nations Convention on the Rights of Persons with Disabilities.

There are 25 principles:
 Fundamental freedoms and basic rights
 Protection of minors
 Life in the community
 Determination of mental illness
 Medical examination
 Confidentiality
 Role of community and culture
 Standards of care
 Treatment
 Medication
 Consent to treatment
 Notice of rights
 Rights and conditions in mental health facilities
 Resources for mental health facilities
 Admission principles
 Involuntary admission
 Review body
 Procedural safeguards
 Access to information
 Criminal offenders
 Complaints
 Monitoring and remedies
 Implementation
 Scope of principles relating to mental health facilities
 Saving of existing rights

References

External links
 Principles for the Protection of Persons with Mental Illness and the Improvement of Mental Health Care (Also on WHO website). United Nations, 1991.

United Nations documents
United Nations General Assembly resolutions
Mental health law
Ethics in psychiatry
1991 in the United Nations